Durgasthan is a village development committee in Baitadi District in the Mahakali Zone of western Nepal. At the time of the 2011 Nepal census it had a population of 3995 and had 726 houses in the town. It had a male population of 1784 and a female population of 2211.

References

Populated places in Baitadi District